The Cowden rail crash occurred on 15 October 1994, near Cowden Station in Kent (UK), when two trains collided head-on, killing five and injuring thirteen, after one of them had passed a signal at danger and entered a single-line section. The cause was concluded as an inoperative Automatic Warning System (AWS)

Incident
The 08:00 Up Uckfield-Oxted DMU train, 2E27 consisting of Class 205 three-car units 205018 and 205001 crewed by driver Brian Barton and guard Jonathan Brett-Andrews. Brett-Andrews had ambitions to become a driver and was in the driver's cab at the time of the collision; this was in breach of the operating rules. It is thought that his presence may have contributed to the accident and there were even suspicions that he might have been at the controls, however this was later found to be untrue.
2E27 departed from Ashurst at about 08:25 and entered a single-track section of line at danger, which ran from Ashurst to Hever station, the signal was meant to be held at danger for 2E27 to await the passage of a Down train.

This Down train was the 08:04 Down Oxted-Uckfield DMU train 2E24, consisting of Class 205 three-car units 205029 and 205032, crewed by driver David Rees and guard R. Boyd. It had just departed Cowden station, already located within the single-line section between Ashurst and Hever, and because of a lack of communication with the train crews, the Oxted signalman was unable to prevent the collision which occurred at around 08:27. In the ensuing collision, the lead car of 2E27 was telescoped by the lead car of 2E24. Both drivers, Barton and Rees, along with guard Brett-Andrews and two passengers, Raymond and Maura Pointer, were killed.

Causes
There were several other contributory factors; it was conjectured that the AWS was inoperative, the signal was dirty and the light intensity was low, and there were no trap points to prevent a train wrongly entering a section against the signal.

It was noted that the Oxted signalman, who was aware of the situation, had no direct means of alerting either driver. He attempted to contact the driver of the down train on the signal post telephone, but to no avail (presumably the driver never heard it above the noise of the engine immediately behind him). The signalman did alert the emergency services to the collision while the trains were still one mile apart. The reason for cancelling the contract to fit Cab Secure Radio to this line prior to the incident, as mandated in the wake of the previous Clapham disaster and Hidden report recommendations, remains unclear; however it seems likely that the changes occurring at the time, such as the channel tunnel and privatisation of the rail network, took priority over funding. Radio began to be installed across the railway immediately following the incident, and an inquiry was started.    

The accident was exacerbated by the age and design of the multiple units involved. The separate-chassis construction of the elderly British Rail Class 205 stock, based on the BR Mk1 design, led to overriding of one carriage by the next. The weight of the diesel engines above the frames of the coach probably did not help. These trains, unpopular with users of the line because of their age, were replaced in 2004 by Turbostars.

The Wealden Line Campaign, which lobbies for service improvements and extensions to the Uckfield line, had previously predicted in its newsletter Missing Link and via the local press that the line's rationalisation - the reduction to single line sections - could lead to such an event. They continue to campaign for the re-doubling of the route and its development within their BML2 project.      

A plaque on the station buildings at Cowden commemorates the accident.

Legacy

Cab Secure Radio began to be introduced

SPAD indicators were introduced to protect the entrance to single lines

AWS magnets were installed at the exits to some maintenance depots to check that a train's automatic warning system is operational.

Eventually the train protection and warning system was installed at the entrance to single lines and other conflict points.

References

Sources 
 
 
 

Railway accidents and incidents in Kent
Railway accidents in 1994
1994 in England
1990s in Kent
Railway accidents involving a signal passed at danger
Train collisions in England
Railway accidents involving fog
Rail accidents caused by a driver's error